Plinthosols are iron-rich soils characterized by the presence of plinthite, petroplinthite or pisoliths.

Distribution

Softer plinthosols are common in the wet tropics, including in the eastern Amazon basin, the central Congo Basin and parts of Southeast Asia. Dryer areas, including the Sudano-Sahelian zone, Southern African savannah, the Indian subcontinent, and parts of Southeast Asia and northern Australia feature mostly harder pisoliths and petroplinthite.

See also

References
 IUSS Working Group WRB: World Reference Base for Soil Resources, fourth edition. International Union of Soil Sciences, Vienna 2022. .

Further reading
 W. Zech, P. Schad, G. Hintermaier-Erhard: Soils of the World. Springer, Berlin 2022, Chapter 10.3.2.

External links 
 profile photos (with classification) WRB homepage
 Profile photos (with classification) IUSS World of Soils

Pedology
Types of soil